Athens is an unincorporated community hamlet in Henry Township, Fulton County, Indiana, originally called Hoover Station. A post office established as Grant, on December 20, 1875, was moved to Hoover Station in 1883; Hoover Station was a waystation for the Chicago and Atlantic Railway, where Jacob Hoover was the postmaster and kept a general store with his brother. Jacob was the son of Henry and Sarah (Curtis)Hoover, the first white settlers of this area. The name was changed to Athens on May 28, 1896, for Athens, Greece.

While the town is slowly being incorporated into Rochester, a tiny post office exists there for the few remaining residents who still have an Athens address.

Geography

References

Unincorporated communities in Fulton County, Indiana
Unincorporated communities in Indiana